Roger Nicholas Edwards, Baron Crickhowell, PC (25 February 1934 – 17 March 2018) was a British Conservative Party politician who served as an MP from 1970 until 1987 and as Secretary of State for Wales during the first two terms of the Thatcher government.

Early life
Edwards was educated at Westminster School and, after completing National Service in the Royal Welch Fusiliers, at Trinity College, Cambridge, graduating in history in 1957. He was a director of William Brandt's insurance brokers and became a member of Lloyd's in 1965.

Political career

Edwards left insurance to take Desmond Donnelly's old seat of Pembroke and served as Secretary of State for Wales in Margaret Thatcher's first and second administrations.

He was adopted by the Pembrokeshire Conservative Party as parliamentary candidate for Pembroke in 1968.

At the 1970 general election, he was elected to the House of Commons as Member of Parliament for Pembrokeshire, which he represented until his retirement at the 1987 general election. From 1975 to 1979, he was Opposition Spokesman for Welsh Affairs (in other words, the Shadow Secretary of State for Wales). When Margaret Thatcher became Prime Minister in 1979, Edwards was appointed Secretary of State for Wales. He served in that position until 1987, when he was given a life peerage, being created on 15 October 1987 as Baron Crickhowell, of Pont Esgob in the Black Mountains and County of Powys.

Later career
Lord Crickhowell was the sole chairman of the National Rivers Authority (NRA) from its inception in 1989 until its merger into the newly created Environment Agency in 1996. Although his was a direct political appointment from the Conservative government, Lord Crickhowell showed commitment to the principles of the NRA and the legislation that it enforced. He spoke in favour of the natural environment and supporting strong enforcement action against major corporate polluters.

During the 1990s, Lord Crickhowell became a leading figure in the campaign for a permanent home for the Welsh National Opera in Cardiff. When the plans were rejected by the Government in 1995, he launched a public attack on his former Conservative colleagues.

Lord Crickhowell sat in the House of Lords as a life peer for over 30 years from 1987 until his death in 2018, making his last appearance in September 2017. He had been associated with many British institutions, including the University of Wales, Cardiff (now Cardiff University), where he was awarded an honorary fellowship in 1984 and served as president from 1988 to 1998. He received an honorary LL.D. from the University of Glamorgan in 2001.

Death
He died on 17 March 2018 at the age of 84. A memorial service was held at St Margaret's Church Westminster on 23 October 2018.

Works

 1980
 September 1997
 October 1999
 2006
 November 2009

References

External links
 The Baron Crickhowell (Burke's Peerage)
 

|-

1934 births
2018 deaths
People from Crickhowell
Alumni of Trinity College, Cambridge
British Secretaries of State
Conservative Party (UK) life peers
Conservative Party (UK) MPs for Welsh constituencies
Members of the Parliament of the United Kingdom for Pembrokeshire constituencies
Members of the Privy Council of the United Kingdom
People associated with Cardiff University
People educated at Westminster School, London
Royal Welch Fusiliers officers
Secretaries of State for Wales
UK MPs 1970–1974
UK MPs 1974
UK MPs 1974–1979
UK MPs 1979–1983
UK MPs 1983–1987
Life peers created by Elizabeth II